Charles Meade (December 24, 1916 – April 10, 2010) was the founder of a Cult first called End Time Ministries, later Meade Ministries, based just south of Lake City, Florida, United States.

Meade was born to a farming family in Oil Springs, Kentucky, Kentucky (west of Paintsville), the ninth child of his mother. According to church literature he was the twelfth of fifteen children.

As a young man, Meade reportedly served in the United States armed forces on the front lines in World War II. According to church literature he was seriously injured more than once, but there is no indication of this in his service record. He claims this is due to his biblical skills in the heart of danger.
During the early 1970s Meade began to carry the gospel of Jesus Christ to various groups of young people in their late teens and early twenties. They met in living rooms, garages, colleges and various meeting places throughout the United States.

He founded Meade Ministries (now Mountaintop Ministries Worldwide) in 1984, he relocated his ministry from South Dakota and Indiana to Lake City, Florida. According to the church, God told Charles Meade that Lake City, Florida, would be the only place that believers could survive Armageddon. In a 1998 New York Times article about doomsday groups, writers Alex Heard and Peter Klebnikov explained Meade's beliefs about the apocalypse: 

Meade was married twice, first to Marie Meade who died of breast cancer on October 24, 1985, and then in November, 1985 to Marlene Helen Malthesen.

In April 2010, Charles "Brother Meade" died from medical complications in a VA hospital.

In December 2015 shocking details came to light about Meade's secret sexual lifestyle. Multiple women came forward stating that Meade had sexual intercourse with them from the age of 13 to their late 20s. This coupled with the gross negligence in the handling of church funds caused church membership to drop and the organization was rebranded Mountaintop Ministries Worldwide

Notes

References
 Hughes, John (1991) "A Town Possessed - Endtimes Ministries" South Florida Sun Sentinel of May 19, 1991, reproduced at Cult Awareness and Information Center
 Leithauser, Tom (1988) "Who is Rev. Charles Meade? Leader of religious sect moving to Lake City" Lake City Reporter of November 21, 1988
 Four-part series by AP writer Todd Lewan (April 5, 2005) Associated Press, accessed via commercial service Lexis/Nexis
"Part I: A self-styled prophet, a legion of followers, and a 'Promised Land' in Florida" reproduced at website The Times and Democrat and as "In Lake City, an apocalyptic Promised Land" in the Gainesville Sun
"Part II: The End Timers thrive in Lake City, but what goes on behind their walls and fences is not always so pretty" reproduced at website The Times and Democrat
"Part III: An unassailable house of worship - and incessant demands for money" reproduced from the Daytona Beach News-Journal of April 18, 2005 at website International Cultic Studies Association; requires Microsoft's Internet Explorer
"Part IV: A 'promised land' made prosperous - yet suspicious and divided" reproduced at website Tampa Bay Online, from Internet Archives
"How this series was reported" from International Cultic Studies Association Web Site (formerly American Family Foundation); requires Microsoft's Internet Explorer

External links
Charles Meade's obituary

1916 births
2010 deaths
20th-century apocalypticists
21st-century apocalypticists
American Christian religious leaders
People from Johnson County, Kentucky